Vysokaya is a rural locality (a village) in Chuchkovskoye Rural Settlement, Sokolsky District, Vologda Oblast, Russia. The population was 7 as of 2002.

Geography 
The distance to Sokol is 86 km, to Chuchkovo is 3 km. Pustoshka is the nearest rural locality.

References 

Rural localities in Sokolsky District, Vologda Oblast